Cameron Harper may refer to:

Cameron Harper (footballer) (born 2001), Scottish footballer
Cameron Harper (soccer) (born 2001), American soccer player